René Le Coq de La Saussaye, (died some time after 1613), from Gaillon-sur-Seine (Eure), in France, was appointed agent and lieutenant by Antoinette de Pons, Marquise de Guercheville, for the founding of the mission of Saint Sauveur on Mount Desert Island in the French colony of Acadia.

References 
 

Year of birth missing
Year of death missing
16th-century births
17th-century deaths
French Roman Catholic missionaries
Roman Catholic missionaries in New France
Roman Catholic missionaries in Canada